The 2017–18 Serie A de México season was split in two tournaments Apertura and Clausura. Serie A is the third-tier football league of Mexico. The season was played between 11 August 2017 and 19 May 2018.

Torneo Apertura

Changes from the previous season
36 teams participated in this season:

Cuervos de Ensenada J.A.P. moved to Tepic and became Deportivo Tepic J.A.P.
Valle Verde F.C. moved to Tuxtla Gutiérrez and became Tuxtla F.C.
Murciélagos F.C. reserve team changed its name to Pacific F.C. and plans to move to Mazatlán on 2019.
Sporting Canamy moves from Mexico City to Oaxtepec.
Chiapas F.C. Premier disappears and Lobos BUAP Premier took its place.
Reynosa F.C. changed its name to Atlético Reynosa.
Atlético Cuernavaca changed its name to Halcones de Morelos.
Tecos F.C. was promoted from Tercera División.
Loros UdeC was relegated from Ascenso MX.
Gavilanes de Matamoros was admitted as an expansion team.
Santos de Soledad and Real Cuautitlán dissolved.
FC Politécnico was relegated to Tercera División.
Atlético Estado de México eliminated its main team, maintaining the reserve team in Tercera División.
Tlaxcala F.C. did not play this season having won its promotion to Ascenso MX, waiting to meet the requirements of the category.

Stadiums and Locations

Group 1

Group 2 
{{Location map+ |Mexico |width=500|float=right |caption=Location of teams in the 2018–19 Serie A Group 2 |places=

{{Location map~ |Mexico|mark=TransparentPlaceholder.png |marksize=1 |lat=25|long=-117|label=}}

{{Location map~ |Mexico|mark=TransparentPlaceholder.png |marksize=1 |lat=20|long=-117|label=}}

{{Location map~ |Mexico|mark=TransparentPlaceholder.png |marksize=1 |lat=17|long=-117|label=}}

Regular season

Group 1

Standings

Results

Group 2

Standings

Results

Regular Season statistics

Scoring 
First goal of the season: Omar Salgado (Tigres UANL Premier)

Top goalscorers 
Players sorted first by goals scored, then by last name.

Source: Liga Premier

Attendance

Per team

Highest and lowest

Source:Liga Premier FMF (available in each game report)

Liguilla de Ascenso (Promotion Playoffs)

The four best teams of each group play two games against each other on a home-and-away basis. The higher seeded teams play on their home field during the second leg. The winner of each match up is determined by aggregate score. In the quarterfinals and semifinals, if the two teams are tied on aggregate the higher seeded team advances. In the final, if the two teams are tied after both legs, the match goes to extra time and, if necessary, a penalty shoot-out.

Quarter-finals
The first legs was played on 29 and 30 November 2017, and the second legs was played on 2 and 3 December 2017.

First leg

Second leg

Semi-finals
The first legs was played on 6 and 7 December 2017, and the second legs was played on 9 and 10 December 2017.

First leg

Second leg

Final
The first leg was played on 13 December 2017, and the second leg was played on 16 December 2017.

First leg

Second leg

Liguilla de Filiales (Reserve Teams Playoffs)

Torneo Clausura

Regular season

Group 1

Standings

Results

Group 2

Standings

Results

Regular Season statistics

Scoring 
First goal of the season: Omar Salgado (Tigres UANL Premier)

Top goalscorers 
Players sorted first by goals scored, then by last name.

Source: Liga Premier

Attendance

Per team

Highest and lowest

Source:Liga Premier FMF (available in each game report)

Liguilla de Ascenso (Promotion Playoffs)

The four best teams of each group play two games against each other on a home-and-away basis. The higher seeded teams play on their home field during the second leg. The winner of each match up is determined by aggregate score. In the quarterfinals and semifinals, if the two teams are tied on aggregate the higher seeded team advances. In the final, if the two teams are tied after both legs, the match goes to extra time and, if necessary, a penalty shoot-out.

Quarter-finals
The first legs was played on 25 and 26 April 2018, and the second legs was played on 28 and 29 April 2018.

First leg

Second leg

Semi-finals
The first legs was played on 2 May 2018, and the second legs was played on 5 May 2018.

First leg

Second leg

Final
The first leg was played on 9 May 2018, and the second leg was played on 12 May 2018.

First leg

Second leg

Liguilla de Filiales (Reserve Teams Playoffs)

Relegation Table 

Last updated: 22 April 2018 Source: Liga Premier FMFP = Position; G = Games played; Pts = Points; Pts/G = Ratio of points to games played

Promotion Final
The Promotion Final is a series of matches played by the champions of the tournaments Apertura and Clausura, the game is played to determine the winning team of the promotion to Ascenso MX. 
The first leg was played on 16 May 2018, and the second leg was played on 19 May 2018.

First leg

Second leg

See also 
2017–18 Liga MX season
2017–18 Ascenso MX season
2017–18 Serie B de México season

References

External links
 Official website of Liga Premier
 Magazine page 

 
1